Pago Haini (born 16 December 1991) is an American rugby union player, currently playing for Rugby New York (Ironworkers) in Major League Rugby (MLR). His preferred position is flanker.

Professional career
Haini signed for Major League Rugby side LA Giltinis ahead of the 2021 Major League Rugby season. He had previously represented Houston SaberCats in Major League Rugby and was signed to the New England Free Jacks. Haini has also represented United States Sevens at two competitions.

References

External links
itsrugby.co.uk Profile

1991 births
Living people
American rugby union players
Rugby union flankers
LA Giltinis players
Houston SaberCats players
New England Free Jacks players
Rugby New York players